Molly Knox Ostertag (born October 28, 1991) is an American cartoonist and writer.  Her work includes the animated series The Owl House, webcomic Strong Female Protagonist, the middle grade graphic novel series (The Witch Boy, The Hidden Witch, and The Midwinter Witch), and on the series Tales of the Night Watchman. She was named one of Forbes magazine's 30 Under 30 in 2021.

Early life 
Ostertag grew up in upstate New York. She attended Bard College and studied illustration and cartooning at the School of Visual Arts (SVA) in New York City, where she graduated in 2014. She moved from upstate New York to Los Angeles in 2016.

Career

Comics
As a comics artist, Ostertag has been drawing the superhero webcomic Strong Female Protagonist written by Brennan Lee Mulligan since 2012, and created the art for the fantasy comic Shattered Warrior written by Sharon Shinn (2017). Her first published work came in 2013 and 2014 when she drew two issues of Tales of the Night Watchman for So What? Press, "The Night Collector" (2013) and "It Came from the Gowanus Canal" (2014). The latter remains one of the series' best-selling issues. In 2016, some of her comics appeared in an anthology with other comic artists titled Chainmail Bikini.

In 2017, Graphix published The Witch Boy, the first graphic novel written and drawn by Ostertag. It is the coming-of-age story of a young boy, Aster, who is intent on becoming a witch in a community where boys are expected to become shapeshifters. Fox Animation acquired the film rights in May 2017, and a sequel, The Hidden Witch, was published in 2018. The third book in the series, The Midwinter Witch, was published in November 2019. The Witch Boy was later described by Daniel Toy of CNN's Underscored as an "emotional, magical story [that] will grab young readers’ attention" which teaches readers the "importance of acceptance and love" while reviewers said that the story of Aster, which begins in the first book, is "parable for gender conformity." Additionally, Aster's tomboy friend, Charlotte "Charlie," who has two dads, is described as not conforming to gender norms, even by the book's publisher, Scholastic. Other works of Ostertag's include the erotic comic Alleycat and the comic How the Best Hunter in the Village Met Her Death, for which she received the 2018 Ignatz Award for Outstanding Story.

Paste described Ostertag's character design as "deft and varied, with a thick, dark line that resembles that of Faith Erin Hicks", noting that she "mostly uses her figures' eyes and their body language to convey emotions." A profile by SVA described her work as "consistently featur[ing] diverse casts of characters—multiracial, of differing gender expressions, sexual orientations, and abilities—whose adventures intertwine social justice and superheroes, peer pressure and magical powers", and noted that her "presiding interest lies in queer content in young adult work". Additionally, Erica Friedman of Yuricon, a long time fan of Ostertag, praised her work, How the Best Hunter in the Village Met Her Death, calling it a tale that will resonate with those "who have come through their own dark forests and transformed into their true selves."

In 2021, an Ostertag graphic novel, The Girl From The Sea, was published. She described it as "teen summer romance graphic novel" set in Nova Scotia, focused on the story of a 15-year-old Korean Canadian girl named Morgan falling in love with a selkie named Keltie. She noted that it is somewhat based on her experience spending summers at Wilneff Island in Nova Scotia as a kid and called the book her "first serious foray" into the romance genre. The Girl from the Sea has been nominated for the GLAAD Media Award for Outstanding Original Graphic Novel/Anthology.

In August 2021, Ostertag was among a group of creators with whom fellow comics writer Nick Spencer formed a deal with the subscription-based newsletter platform Substack to publish creator-owned comics stories, essays, and instructional guides on that platform.

Animation
In animation, Ostertag has been working since 2014 as a designer for Star vs. the Forces of Evil and as a writer for The Owl House and ThunderCats Roar. In October 2020, she called on Amazon to let her make an animation "centered around Hobbit children in The Shire." In January 2021, it was announced that Netflix was adapting her graphic novel, The Witch Boy, into an animated musical directed by Minkyu Lee.

On December 11, 2020, a project by Ostertag for Disney Television Animation under the name Neon Galaxy was registered.

Other writings
From July to September 2020, Ostertag published a The Lord of the Rings fanfiction titled "In All the Ways There Were" which shipped Frodo Baggins and Samwise "Sam" Gamgee together, a story which became relatively popular. She called the fan fiction an extension of her "Lord of the Rings obsession," even creating an alternate Twitter account on the subject, with the handle @hobbitgay, and stated she is also writing a romantic fan fiction "retelling the entire series from Sam Gamgee’s point of view." Furthermore, she stated that she saw The Lord of the Rings as a romance and argued that she rarely sees exploration of "romance as transformative," portrayed, in fiction, with authenticity. Additionally, in 2019, Ostertag created a fan comic depicting a post-credits scene of The Return of the King.

In August 2021, Ostertag began writing a Substack newsletter about graphic novels titled "In The Telling". In October 2021, she announced that she would be releasing a graphic novel entitled "Darkest Knight" on her Substack in weekly installments for paying subscribers, which would focus on a relationship between a teenage cis girl and a teenage trans girl, and will later be released to general subscribers.

In media
In 2014, she appeared in the documentary She Makes Comics.

Personal life
Ostertag is gay and married fellow cartoonist Nate "ND" Stevenson in September 2019. Stevenson began working on She-Ra and the Princesses of Power at the same time he began dating Ostertag, who was influential on the show "from the very beginning," coming up with a major plot twist in the show's final season.

Ostertag is also a member of the Democratic Socialists of America, and has illustrated a campaign poster for Los Angeles City Councilmember Nithya Raman.

Bibliography

Graphic novels

Graphic novel series
 Witch Boy trilogy
The Witch Boy (writer/artist, Graphix, 2017)
 The Hidden Witch (writer/artist, Graphix, 2018)
 The Midwinter Witch (writer/artist, Graphix, 2019)
Untitled Dungeons & Dragons graphic novel series [Upcoming]
Book 1 (writer, art by Xanthe Bouma, HarperCollins Children's Books, 2022) [Upcoming]

Other graphic novels
Tales of the Night Watchman (So What? Press, 2011–Present)
"The Night Collector" (artist, 2013) & "Sanctuary" (characters co-created by, 2018)
"It Came from the Gowanus Canal" (artist, 2014) & "It Came from the Gowanus Canal...Again!" (characters co-created by, 2017)
 Shattered Warrior (artist, written by Sharon Shinn, Macmillan, 2017)
 The Girl from the Sea (writer/artist, Graphix, 2021)
 Darkest Night (writer/artist, Substack, 2021)

Role-playing games 

 Van Richten's Guide to Ravenloft (writer, Wizards of the Coast, 2021)

Webcomics
 Alleycat (writer/artist, 2017)
 How the Best Hunter in the Village Met Her Death (writer/artist, 2018)
 Strong Female Protagonist (artist, written by Brennan Lee Mulligan, 2012–2018)
 Queens of the Steepe (writer/artist, 2015)

Filmography

Film

Television

Web shows and series

Notes

References

Further reading
  ("...an author, writer, and illustrator who isn’t afraid to explore such ideas, and I recently caught up with her to share queer stories and talk about her career as a proud lesbian woman pushing for new, groundbreaking stories in a number of spaces.")

External links

 

1991 births
Living people
American people of German descent
American webcomic creators
American women screenwriters
American women television writers
Place of birth missing (living people)
American female comics artists
Female comics writers
Lesbian screenwriters
American lesbian writers
American lesbian artists
American LGBT screenwriters
LGBT comics creators
School of Visual Arts alumni
Bard College alumni
Members of the Democratic Socialists of America
Fan fiction writers
Women science fiction and fantasy writers
Tolkien artists